Stefan Żeromski (14 October 1864 – 20 November 1925) was a Polish novelist and dramatist belonging to the Young Poland movement at the turn of the 20th century. He was called the "conscience of Polish literature".

He also wrote under the pen names Maurycy Zych, Józef Katerla, and Stefan Iksmoreż.

He was nominated four times for the Nobel Prize in Literature.

Life 

Stefan Żeromski was born on 14 October 1864 at Strawczyn, near Kielce.

On 2 September 1892, he married a widow, Oktawia Rodkiewiczowa, née Radziwiłłowiczówna, whom he had met at a spa in Nałęczów, co-owned by her stepfather. One of the witnesses at the wedding was the novelist Bolesław Prus, an admirer of Oktawia's who had not been in favor of the marriage.

The newlyweds moved to Switzerland, where Żeromski worked from 1892 to 1896 as a librarian at the Polish National Museum in Rapperswil . At Oktawia's request Prus, though no admirer of Żeromski's writings, helped the struggling couple as much as he could.

In 1913 Żeromski started a new family with the painter Anna Zawadzka, whom he had met in 1908; they had a daughter, Monika.

In 1924, in recognition of Żeromski's achievements, President Stanisław Wojciechowski gave him a three-room apartment on the second floor of Warsaw's Royal Castle.

In the same year, Żeromski was shortlisted for the Nobel Prize in literature.

He died on 20 November 1925 in Warsaw.

Selected works 
 Twilight (Zmierzch, short story, 1892)
 Ravens and Crows Will Peck Us to Pieces (Rozdziobią nas kruki, wrony, 1895)
 Doctor Peter (Doktor Piotr, 1895)
 The Labors of Sisyphus (Syzyfowe prace, 1898), about 19th- and 20th-century Tsarist efforts to russify the Russian-occupied part of Poland)
 Homeless People (Ludzie bezdomni, 1899)
 Ashes (1904)
 Forest Echoes (Echa leśne, 1905)
 The Wages of Sin (Dzieje grzechu, 1908)
 Elegy for a Hetman (Duma o hetmanie, 1908)
 The Rose (Róża, 1909)
 Sułkowski (1910)
 The Faithful River (Wierna rzeka, 1912)
 The Charm of Life (Uroda życia, 1912)
 Struggles with Satan (Walka z szatanem, vols. 1-2, 1916; vol. 3, 1919)
 Wind from the Sea (Wiatr od morza, 1922)
 My Quail Has Fled (Uciekła mi przepióreczka, 1924)
 Seedtime (Przedwiośnie, 1924)
 Journals (Dzienniki, published posthumously, 1953-1956)

Żeromski's works have been translated into several languages. They have been translated into Croatian by a member of the Croatian Academy, Stjepan Musulin.

Films
Several of Żeromski's novels have been filmed, by Walerian Borowczyk (Dzieje grzechu, "A Story of Sin"), Andrzej Wajda (Popioły, "Ashes"), and Filip Bajon (Przedwiośnie, "The Spring to Come").

See also 
 Young Poland
 Republic of Zakopane
 List of Poles

Notes

References 
 Irena Kwiatkowska-Siemieńska, Stefan Żeromski. La nature dans son expériences et sa pensée (Stefan Żeromski: Nature in His Experiences and Thought), Préface de Jean Fabre, Professeur à la Sorbonne (Preface by Jean Fabre, Professor at the Sorbonne), Paris, Nizet, 1964 (256 pp.).
 Mortkowicz-Olczakowa, Hanna (1961). Bunt wspomnień. Państwowy Instytut Wydawniczy.

External links

 
 
 

1864 births
1925 deaths
People from Kielce County
People from Kielce Governorate
Clan of Jelita
Polish Calvinist and Reformed Christians
19th-century Polish novelists
20th-century Polish novelists
19th-century Polish dramatists and playwrights
20th-century Polish dramatists and playwrights
19th-century Polish male writers
20th-century Polish male writers
Polish male novelists
Polish male dramatists and playwrights
Polish diarists
Polish cooperative organizers
Grand Crosses of the Order of Polonia Restituta
Commanders of the Order of Polonia Restituta
19th-century pseudonymous writers
20th-century pseudonymous writers